Hove is a borough constituency in East Sussex represented in the House of Commons of the UK Parliament since 2015 by Labour's Peter Kyle.

It has the joint shortest name of any constituency in the current Parliament, with 4 letters, the same as Bath.

Boundaries 

1950–1983: The County Borough of Hove, and the Urban District of Portslade-by-Sea.

1983–2010: The Borough of Hove.

2010–present: The City of Brighton and Hove wards of Brunswick and Adelaide, Central Hove, Goldsmid, Hangleton and Knoll, Hove Park, North Portslade, South Portslade, Westbourne, and Wish.

The constituency covers Hove and Portslade in the city of Brighton and Hove.

Constituency profile
The settlement of Hove is an economically active seaside resort which is both a commuter town and centred in an area of high local employment, stretching from Portsmouth to London Gatwick Airport. The seat acted as a barometer of the national result between 1979 and 2015.

History 
It was not until the 1950 general election, when major boundary changes occurred in Brighton, that Hove acquired a parliamentary seat of its own, having previously been in the former two-seat Brighton constituency. Hove was a Conservative stronghold until the 1997 general election, when the Labour Party saw a landslide parliamentary victory and with it, as in Greater London, wide success on the developed East Sussex coast.

Labour retained the seat, though with narrow majorities, at the 2001 and 2005 general elections. The Liberal Democrats including their two predecessor parties amassed their largest share of the vote in 2010 at 22.6% of the vote. Mike Weatherley, a Conservative, regained the seat at the 2010 general election. Weatherley stood down after one term, and the 2015 election saw Peter Kyle regain the seat for Labour on a 3.1% swing. The 2015 result gave the seat the 14th-smallest majority of Labour's 232 seats by percentage of majority.  
Kyle was reelected in 2017 by a margin of 32.6%, a 15.1% swing to Labour; this was not only the biggest margin Labour had ever won Hove by, but the largest margin any MP for Hove had won since 1987. The Conservative Party polled its lowest number of votes since 2005 and recorded their lowest percentage of the vote (31.6%) in the constituency since its creation.  Turnout at the 2017 general election was 77.6%, the highest turnout in the constituency at a General Election since its creation in 1950.

Members of Parliament

Elections

Elections in the 2010s

Peter Kyle’s 21.8% vote share increase was the 5th largest for any Labour Party candidate at the 2017 election.

Elections in the 2000s

Elections in the 1990s

Elections in the 1980s

Elections in the 1970s

Elections in the 1960s

Elections in the 1950s

See also 
 List of parliamentary constituencies in East Sussex
 Opinion polling for the next United Kingdom general election in individual constituencies

Notes

References

Sources 
 Election result, 2005 (BBC)
 Election results, 1997 – 2001 (BBC)
 Election results, 1997 – 2001 (Election Demon)
 Election results, 1983 – 1992 (Election Demon)
 Election results, 1992 – 2005 (Guardian)
 Election results, 1951 – 2001 (Keele University)
 F. W. S. Craig. British Parliamentary Election Results 1950–1973.

Hove
Parliamentary constituencies in South East England
Politics of Brighton and Hove
Constituencies of the Parliament of the United Kingdom established in 1950